Richie Brockelman, Private Eye is an American detective drama that aired on NBC for five episodes in March and April 1978, with Dennis Dugan in the starring role. The Rockford Files was used to launch the series via character crossover in a 2-hour episode at the end of the 1977-78 season.

Premise
The hour-long series focused on Richie Brockelman, a 22-year-old, college-educated private investigator with his own agency in Los Angeles, California. Dugan was actually thirty-one when cast in the role. Brockleman's main method in solving his cases was thinking he could talk his way in or out of any situation he was in. Usually there was a woman involved in the plot that was in some kind of distress, but in the end, he solves the case though he does not get the girl.

Initially filmed as a pilot for a TV series in 1976 titled "Richie Brockelman: The Missing 24 Hours," it was not picked up by NBC. Stephen J. Cannell reworked the character into a two-hour episode of The Rockford Files titled "The House On Willis Avenue" as the last new episode of the 1977-78 season. Rockford and Brockelman join forces to solve the murder of a veteran PI who taught both of them the ropes. It was followed by a limited run of Richie Brockelman, Private Eye. Brockelman later appeared in "Never Send a Boy King to Do a Man's Job", another two-part episode of The Rockford Files.

The theme song, "School's Out," was written by Mike Post, Pete Carpenter, Herb Pederson and Stephen Geyer. An extended version of the song from Mike Post's Television Theme Songs appeared on iTunes and amazon.com for download. The song's performers were credited as Stephen Geyer & 
Herb Peterson and Mike Post & Pete Carpenter.

Cast
 Dennis Dugan as Richie Brockelman
 Robert Hogan as Sgt. Ted Coopersmith
 Barbara Bosson as Sharon Deterson
 Norman Fell as Mr. Brockelman (Pilot)
 John Randolph as Mr. Brockelman (Series)

Cancellation
After its launch from The Rockford Files, Richie Brockelman, Private Eye performed well for NBC. However, in the end, the ratings were not strong enough for NBC to order a full season of new episodes for the 1978-79 season. NBC was looking for hit shows at the time and Richie Brockelman needed to be scheduled as a follow-up after a strong lead-in, which the network did not have at the time.

The series was broadcast in England on ITV Anglia television during the summer of 1978. A second two-hour The Rockford Files episode was produced that aired in the spring of 1979 which ended the show.

When The Rockford Files went into syndication in the 1980s, the five episodes of "Richie Brockelman" were included as part of the package. Two of the episodes were later re-edited for syndication as a 90-minute Universal TV movie in the 1980s called The Diary of Richie Brockelman.

Episodes

Pilot (1976)

Season 1 (1978)

Appearances on The Rockford Files
The character of "Richie Brockelman" appeared on two episodes of The Rockford Files; both episodes were two hours long:

 "The House on Willis Avenue" (season four, episodes 21 & 22; original airdate February 24, 1978).
When a fellow private investigator is killed on the Ventura Freeway, Jim Rockford and Richie Brockelman team up to find out if it really was an accident.  This episode first introduced the Richie Brockelman character and was used as a spin-off episode for the series.  In this episode, it is established that Richie Brockleman is 22 years old.
 "Never Send a Boy King to Do a Man's Job" (season five, episodes 20 & 21; original airdate March 3, 1979).
Harold Gould plays the part of Mr. Brockelman, Richie's father. The elder Brockelman gets cheated out of his business and Richie enlists Rockford to help him run a con on the men who cheated his father.

References

External links 
 
 

1978 American television series debuts
1978 American television series endings
1970s American crime drama television series
English-language television shows
NBC original programming
Television series by Stephen J. Cannell Productions
Television series by Universal Television
American television spin-offs
Television shows set in Los Angeles
The Rockford Files